Odile Saugues (born 26 January 1943) was a member of the National Assembly of France.  She represented Puy-de-Dôme's 1st constituency in the Puy-de-Dôme department, from 1997 to 2017 as a member of the Socialiste, radical, citoyen et divers gauche.

References

1943 births
Living people
Socialist Party (France) politicians
Women members of the National Assembly (France)
Deputies of the 12th National Assembly of the French Fifth Republic
Deputies of the 13th National Assembly of the French Fifth Republic
Deputies of the 14th National Assembly of the French Fifth Republic
21st-century French women politicians